Şehrazat  is a 1964 Turkish crime thriller film, directed by Halit Refiğ and starring Orhan Günsiray, Leyla Sayar, and Nilüfer Aydan.

References

External links
Şehrazat at the Internet Movie Database

1964 films
Turkish crime thriller films
1960s crime thriller films
Films directed by Halit Refiğ
1960s lost films
Lost Turkish films
Turkish black-and-white films